Joanne Broadbent  (born 29 November 1965) is an Australian former cricketer who played as an all-rounder, batting left-handed and bowling left-arm medium. She appeared in 10 Test matches and 60 One Day Internationals for Australia between 1990 and 2000. In August 1998, she scored 200 in a Test match against England, and took one ODI five-wicket haul, 5/10 against New Zealand in 1993. She played domestic cricket for South Australia and Queensland.

Broadbent received the Medal of the Order of Australia (OAM) in the 2018 Queen's Birthday Honours for service to cricket.

References

External links
 
 

1965 births
Living people
Cricketers from Adelaide
Australia women Test cricketers
Australia women One Day International cricketers
South Australian Scorpions cricketers
Queensland Fire cricketers
Recipients of the Medal of the Order of Australia